The Ros (Ros’) is a river in Ukraine, a right tributary of the Dnieper. The Ros finds its source in the village of Ordyntsi in Pohrebyshche Raion, Vinnytsia Oblast. Larger settlements on the river are Bila Tserkva, Bohuslav, and Korsun-Shevchenkivskyi.

Some historians have suggested the possibility that the name of the Kyivan Rus', the old East Slavic state, may have originated from the name of the Ros river, the theory referred to as the antinormanist theory of the origin of Rus'.

Cities and towns on the Ros'
Pohrebyshche
Volodarka
Bila Tserkva
Rokytne
Bohuslav
Korsun-Shevchenkivskyi
Stebliv

References

External links 
 

Rivers of Vinnytsia Oblast